Jean-Antoine Panet (June 8, 1751 – May 17, 1815) was a notary, lawyer, judge, seigneur and political figure in Lower Canada.

He was born in Quebec in 1751, the son of Jean-Claude Panet. He served in the militia defending the town of Quebec during the American Revolution and he later attained the rank of Lieutenant-colonel in the militia. Panet entered practice as a notary in 1772, but also began to practice as a lawyer the following year. He became seigneur of Bourg-Louis in 1777. In 1779, he married Louise-Philippe, daughter of Philippe-Louis-François Badelard. Like others in the province, Panet lobbied for a legislative assembly. In 1792, he was elected to the Legislative Assembly of Lower Canada for the Upper Town of Quebec; he was elected as the first speaker for the assembly. In 1794, he was  appointed a judge of the Court of Common Pleas and resigned his post as speaker at that time. Panet was also named a judge of the Court of King's Bench for the District of Montreal, but refused this second appointment. He was reelected to the assembly for the Upper Town in 1796, 1800, 1804 and later in 1814. In 1808, he was elected for Huntingdon; he was reelected there in 1809 and 1810. He was elected speaker again in 1797, serving until 1815, when he resigned due to poor health. In 1815, he resigned his seat in the legislative assembly to accept a nomination to the Legislative Council.

He died in office at Quebec in 1815. In 1823 the government awarded his widow an annual pension.

His son Philippe also served in the legislative assembly. His son Louis served in the Senate of Canada. His brother Bernard Claude was archbishop of Quebec and his brother Jacques was a parish priest of Notre-Dame-de-Bon-Secours.

References

External links
 

1751 births
1815 deaths
Politicians from Quebec City
French Canadians in the American Revolution
Members of the Legislative Assembly of Lower Canada
Members of the Legislative Council of Lower Canada
Canadian notaries
Lower Canada judges
18th-century Canadian politicians
19th-century Canadian politicians